Cappy Ricks is a 1921 American silent adventure film directed by Tom Forman and written by Peter B. Kyne, Albert S. Le Vino, Edward E. Rose, and Waldemar Young. The film stars Thomas Meighan, Charles S. Abbe, Agnes Ayres, Hugh Cameron, John St. Polis, Paul Everton and Eugenie Woodward. The film was released on August 21, 1921, by Paramount Pictures.   
On Broadway in the 1919 season, the play version starred William Courtenay and Tom Wise.

Cast
Thomas Meighan as Matt Peasley
Charles S. Abbe as Cappy Ricks
Agnes Ayres as Florrie Ricks
Hugh Cameron as Murphy
John St. Polis as Skinner 
Paul Everton as Captain Kendall
Eugenie Woodward as Mrs. Peasley
Tom O'Malley as Captain Jones
Ivan Linow as Ole Peterson
William Wally as Swenson
John Francis Dillon as Larsen 
Gladys Granger as Doris

Survival status
It is not known whether Cappy Ricks currently survives. The Library of Congress database of American silent films lists an incomplete print of the film as preserved in the UCLA Film and Television Archive.

References

External links

1921 films
American adventure films
1921 adventure films
Paramount Pictures films
Films directed by Tom Forman
American black-and-white films
American silent feature films
1920s English-language films
1920s American films
Silent adventure films